Your Family or Mine is an American sitcom series based on the Israeli series Savri Maranan. The series is centered on a young married couple, Oliver (Kyle Howard) and Kelli (Kat Foster), and alternates between their two families. Your Family or Mine was announced by TBS in mid 2014 with a ten-episode order. It premiered on April 7, 2015. On October 23, 2015, TBS quietly cancelled the series after one season.

Cast
 Kyle Howard as Oliver Weston 
 Kat Foster as Kelli Weston
 Richard Dreyfuss as Louis Weston, Oliver's father
 JoBeth Williams as Ricky Weston, Oliver's mother
 Ed Begley Jr. as Gil Durnin, Kelli's father
 Cynthia Stevenson as Jan Durnin, Kelli's mother
 Danny Comden as Jason Weston, Oliver's older brother
 Angela Kinsey as Claire Weston, Jason's wife
 Andrew Lees as Blake Weston, Oliver's younger brother
 Stephanie Hunt as Dani Durnin, Kelli's youngest sister
 Collette Wolfe as Shawni Durnin, Kelli's younger sister
 Jared Breeze as Dougie Durnin, Shawni's son
 Adrian Gonzalez as Enzo, Shawni's boyfriend

Episodes
TBS announced that the first season will contain a total of ten episodes; it premiered on April 7, 2015.

References

External links
 

2010s American sitcoms
2015 American television series debuts
2015 American television series endings
English-language television shows
TBS (American TV channel) original programming
Television series about families
Television series by Sony Pictures Television
American television series based on Israeli television series
Television shows set in Washington (state)